Amphicarpaea bracteata (hog-peanut or ground bean) is an annual to perennial vine in the legume family, native to woodland, thickets, and moist slopes in eastern North America.

Description
Leaves have three leaflets and are held alternately on twining stems.

Flowers are pink to white and bloom from late summer to autumn. The flowers are either open for cross-pollination or closed and self-pollinating.  The closed flowers may be above or below ground.

Seeds from open flowers are held in a flat pod, pointed at both ends, that dries when mature and twists to release the seeds. Seeds from closed flowers are held in round pods with a single seed each. The roots and the cooked seeds from under the ground are edible. The seeds which become subterranean from flowers on stolons give it the name peanut.

Location
This plant can be found in eastern North America, as well as further west into the Midwestern region, including Indiana, Illinois, and Wisconsin.

References

External links

 
 
 
 
  

Phaseoleae
Plants described in 1753
Taxa named by Carl Linnaeus
Plants used in Native American cuisine
Flora of Eastern Canada
Flora of the United States